The Chushul Chakzam, or simply Chakzam which literally means "iron bridge" in Standard Tibetan, was a suspension bridge that spanned the Yarlung Tsangpo river in modern-day Qüxü County near Lhasa, Tibet. It was built in 1430 by Thang Tong Gyalpo. The southern bridgehead was built on the mountain Chowuri, which is sacred in Tibetan Buddhism. This mountain was a site where Guru Rinpoche and Trisong Detsen had meditated during the 8th Century.

In 1444, a monastery Chaksam Chuwori was founded on the southern bridgehead. During its existence, the monastery served as the seat of Chakzampa school of Tibetan Buddhism. Supported by the bridge toll, the monastery at one point hosted about 100 monks. The monastery was destroyed during the Cultural Revolution.

History

By the 1860s, the bridge was in a state of disrepair that a ferry was in operation slightly upstream offering safer passage. By 1904, the river had overflown the north bank leaving the northern bridgehead on an island, thus rendering the bridge functionally ineffective. The ferryman mostly came from a nearby village of Chun or Junba, which is the only fishing village in Tibet. The ferry service continued as late as 1959.

During the Qing expedition to Tibet of 1910, the 13th Dalai Lama decided to seek refuge in India. His general Tsarong fought a skirmish against the Chinese here, holding their advances allowing the Dalai Lama to safely arrive in India.

The bridge was torn down by the Chinese government in the 1950s when they were building the concrete bridge in its place. The new concrete bridge Qushui Yaluzangbujiang Bridge opened on August 1, 1966.

See also
 List of bridges in China

References

External links 
 lcags zam chu bo ri - Buddhist Digital Resource Center

Bridges completed in 1430
Suspension bridges in Tibet
Qüxü County